Shubra Palace is a royal palace in Taif, Saudi Arabia. It was one of the royal residences until 1995 when it was transformed into a museum.

History
The building was originally constructed in 1858 as a two-storey house. It was rebuilt by Ali Pasha, former sharif of Mecca, and completed in 1905. It was named after a palace built in Cairo, Egypt.

Following the capture of the city by Saudis the Shubra Palace was used by King Abdulaziz as summer residence. Two of his sons, Prince Talal and Prince Nawwaf, were born there. It is where King Abdulaziz died in 1953.

King Faisal used the Shubra Palace as a summer residence. The palace was also used as the office of Crown Prince Sultan.

In 1995 the palace was made a heritage museum.

Layout and style
The building consists of four floors and four uniform facades with gardens. and The windows and balconies have a criss-crossed pattern of strips of wood, known as latticework. The interior of the building is designed with marble from Carrara, Italy.

References

External links

1905 establishments in the Ottoman Empire
Buildings and structures of the Ottoman Empire
History museums in Saudi Arabia
House of Saud
Palaces in Saudi Arabia
Royal residences in Saudi Arabia